Peirsol is a surname. Notable people with the surname include:

 Aaron Peirsol (born 1983), American competitive swimmer
 Hayley Peirsol (born 1985), American competitive swimmer

See also
 Peirson